’’Destination Unknown’’ is an album by Ron Sexsmith and Don Kerr, released on September 6, 2005.  It is Ron Sexsmith’s ninth studio album and was received with critical acclaim.

Track listing
”Listen” – 2:33
”One Less Shadow” – 2:53
”Lemonade Stand” – 3:31
”Reacquainted” – 3:26
”Chasing Forever” – 3:52
”Counting on Time” – 3:06
”Only Me” – 2:50
”You’ve Been Waiting” – 2:39
”Raindrops in My Coffee” – 2:35
”I’ve Been Away” – 2:51
”Diana Sweets” – 3:25
”Your Guess Is as Good as Mine” – 2:32
”Tree-Lined Streets” – 4:01
”One Less Shadow (Live)” (Japanese Bonus Track) 
”Listen (Live)” (Japanese Bonus Track)

References

2005 albums
Ron Sexsmith albums
V2 Records albums